Nadiya Ke Paar is a 1982 Indian Awadhi language drama film directed by Govind Moonis. Based on the first half of the novel Kohbar Ki Shart by Keshav Prasad Mishra, the movie is set in Kanpur, Uttar Pradesh. It featured an ensemble cast comprising Sachin, Sadhana Singh, Inder Thakur, Mitali, Savita Bajaj, Sheela David, Leela Mishra and Soni Rat. It was majorly shot in the Bijaipur Village in Jaunpur District.The film was one of the Highest grossing films of 1982.

The film was released on 1 January 1982, Rajshri Productions  later remade the film  in 1994 as Hum Aapke Hain Koun..!.

Plot
The story is based on the first half of a novel, Kohbar Ki Shart by Keshav Prasad Mishra. A Brahmin farmer from eastern Uttar Pradesh lives with his two nephews. He falls ill and is treated by a Vaidya (indigenous medical practitioner) from another village. When the farmer feels okay, he asks the Vaidya about his fees. The Vaidya asks for the farmer's eldest nephew to marry his eldest daughter. The farmer readily agrees.

Omkar marries the Vaidya's elder daughter Roopa, and they start living happily. Roopa gives birth to a baby. During Roopa's pregnancy, her younger sister Gunja comes to live with her. While there, she falls in love with Omkar's younger brother Chandan.

Learning of their love, Roopa promises to help them marry. But, she dies in an accident; and nobody else knows about the love affair. The farmer and the Vaidya decide that Gunja should marry the widower Omkar, to take care of her sister's baby. But moments before the wedding rituals are completed, Chandan and Gunja's love affair is revealed. He is allowed to marry Gunja with everyone's consent.

The rural culture and languages of Uttar Pradesh are portrayed authentically in the film. The movie is based on the first half of the novel. It changes the partners in the second marriage, as the novel had the proposed marriage between Gunja and Omkar taking place. The novel proceeded with the development of their relationship, where Omkar dies of illness and eventually Gunja also dies leaving Chandan alone.

Most of the film was shot at the village Vijaipur near Kerakat, Jaunpur district, Uttar Pradesh, India.

Cast
Sachin as Chandan Tiwari; Omkar's younger brother
Sadhana Singh as Gunja Tiwari; Vaidji's youngest daughter; Roopa's younger sister ; Chandan's Love Interest and Turned - Wife
Mitali as Roopa Tiwari; Vaidji elder daughter; Gunja's elder sister; Omkar's wife; Chandhan sister in - law.
Vishnukumar Vyas as Vaidji (Gunja's and Roopa's father)
Leela Mishra as Kaki 
Inder Thakur as Omkar Tiwari
Ram Mohan as Farmer (Uncle of Omkar and Chandan)
Sheela Sharma as Rajjo (Chandan's childhood friend / had a crush on Chandan)
Ranjana Sachdev as Gunja's mother

Soundtrack
The soundtrack of the album was composed by the famous music composer Ravindra Jain. The lyrics also were by Ravindra Jain.  The movie contains many melodious songs which are given below. Songs like "Kaun Disaa Mein Le Ke" and "Jogiji Dheere Dheere" are still popular.

Box office
It became the 19th highest grossing film of the year, despite being non-Hindi film.

References

External links

1980s Hindi-language films
Films based on Indian novels
Films shot in Uttar Pradesh
Films set in Uttar Pradesh
Films about Indian weddings
Rajshri Productions films
Bhojpuri films remade in other languages